The Canadian Turf Stakes is a Grade III American Thoroughbred horse race, by invitation for four-year-olds and older over a distance of one and one-sixteenth miles on the turf track, held annually in late February or early March at Gulfstream Park, Hallandale Beach, Florida. The event currently carries a purse of $150,000.

History
The race was first run in 1967 and was named in recognition of the Canadian Centennial that was being celebrated that year by many Canadian racing fans who vacation in Florida during the winter months.

The 1990 Canadian Triple Crown champion and Horse of the Year, Izvestia, wintered in Florida and made his 1991 racing debut with a win in this race.

The race was downgraded to a listed race for 2005 and 2006 when it was restored to its Grade III status.

In 2005, Old Forester set a new Gulfstream Park turf course record for  miles in winning the Canadian Turf Handicap in a time of 1:38.20.

In 2009, the race was raced at a distance of one mile. It was run in two divisions in 1973, 1977, 1978, 1979, 1983, 1985, 1986, 1987.

Records

Time record:  
1 mile: 1:31.58 – Courageous Cat  (2010)
 miles: 1:38.20  – Old Forester   (2005)
 miles: 1:38.20  – Devil's Cup  (1997)

Margins:
6 lengths – Jungle Cove (1970), Super Sunrise (1983), The Vid (1995)

Most wins:
 2 – Equalize (1988, 1989)
 2 – The Vid (1995, 1996)
 2 - Heart To Heart (2016, 2017)

Most wins by an owner:
 2 – Maribel G. Blum (1971, 1977)
 2 – Dogwood Stable (1978, 1981)
 2 – Harbor View Farm (1975, 1985)
 2 – A. J. Menditeguy Stable (1988, 1989)
 2 – Joseph J. Sullivan (1995, 1996)
 2 – Buckram Oak (1979, 2000)
 2 – Terry Hamilton (2016, 2017)

Most wins by a jockey:
 6 – Jerry Bailey (1977, 1985, 1988, 1993, 1995, 1998)

Most wins by a trainer:
 6 – William I. Mott (1993, 1994, 2005, 2010, 2015, 2019)
 6 – Todd A. Pletcher (2004, 2006, 2009, 2012, 2020, 2023)

Winners

Legend:

 
 

Notes:

§ Ran as an entry

See also 
 List of American and Canadian Graded races

References

Graded stakes races in the United States
Grade 3 stakes races in the United States
Open mile category horse races
Horse races in Florida
Turf races in the United States
Gulfstream Park
Recurring sporting events established in 1967
1967 establishments in Florida